Billy Smith (born 7 November 1999) is an Australian professional rugby league footballer who plays as a  for the Sydney Roosters in the National Rugby League.

Background
Smith was born in Sydney, New South Wales, Australia.

Playing career

Prior to his league career, Smith attended high school at The Scots College where he played for the school's 1st XV in the rugby union format.

2018
Smith played for the Wyong Roos during the 2018 Intrust Super Premiership NSW season.  After Wyong exited the competition, Smith played for North Sydney in the first half of the 2019 Canterbury Cup NSW season scoring nine tries in six games before receiving a call up to the Sydney Roosters first grade side.

2019

In round 23 of the 2019 NRL season, Smith made his NRL debut for the Roosters against the St. George Illawarra Dragons scoring a try in a 34-12 victory at Kogarah Oval.

2020
During pre-season training for the 2020 NRL season, Smith suffered an anterior cruciate ligament (ACL) knee injury during a contact session.  Sydney Roosters head coach Trent Robinson confirmed the injury saying “It’s Billy’s other knee and it’s an ACL,  One of the doctors was telling me a stat where once you suffer one ACL injury you’re then a 25 per cent chance of doing the other knee inside two years if you’re under 21.  We’re all feeling for Billy, there was a big opportunity there for him but the type of person he is he’ll fight back from this".  Smith was widely tipped to start the year at left centre after the departure of Latrell Mitchell. Smith reported to the NRL integrity unit regarding knowledge about the infamous Sam Burgess sexting scandal.

2021
On 17 February 2021, Smith was ruled out for four months with a shoulder injury which he suffered at training.

In round 17 of the 2021 NRL season, Smith made his long awaited return and scored a try during the Sydney Roosters 22-16 victory over Canterbury-Bankstown.
On 27 July, it was revealed that Smith would be ruled out for the rest of the 2021 NRL season after suffering a lisfranc foot injury.

2022
In round 18 of the 2022 NRL season, Smith was taken from the field during the Sydney Roosters 54-26 victory over St. George Illawarra with a knee injury.  Smith was later ruled out for the rest of the 2022 NRL season with an ACL injury.

References

External links
Sydney Roosters profile

1999 births
Living people
Australian rugby league players
Sydney Roosters players
Rugby league centres
North Sydney Bears NSW Cup players
Rugby league players from Sydney